Yoff is a town (commune d'arrondissement), part of the city (commune) of Dakar, located in Senegal. It lies north of downtown Dakar and immediately north of Dakar Airport (Dakar-Yoff-Léopold Sédar Senghor International Airport). The town is built along the broad beach at Yoff Bay. According to the 2014 census, the population of Yoff is 89,442 inhabitants. Yoff is one of the four original Lebou villages of the Cap-Vert Peninsula, along with Hann, Ngor, and Ouakam.

Overview

Administration is devolved to the town, which is essentially run by the Layene Islamic Brotherhood, the town featuring the mausoleum of its founder.  As a result, no alcohol is available in the town.  Fishing is an important local industry, as are the Lebou ndeup healing ceremonies (see Saltigue).  There are numerous construction-industry businesses and suppliers in the Yoff area, and it includes the largest Muslim cemetery serving greater Dakar.

Senegal Airlines has its head office on the airport property. At one time Air Sénégal International had its head office on the grounds of the airport.

References

External links

 Geja Roosjen. Stichting Yoff: Project Moving Birds for Senegal 2006-2007.  Amsterdam, the Netherlands.  Retrieved 2009-01-20.
  Richard Dumez and Moustapha Kâ. Yoff Le Territoire Assiégé: Un village lébou dans la banlieue de Dakar. Dossiers régions côtières et petites îles 7.  Unesco (2000).
 Dakar.  Britannica Online (retrieved 2009-01-20)

Arrondissements of Dakar